A church monument is an architectural or sculptural memorial to a deceased person or persons, located within a Christian church. It can take various forms ranging from a simple commemorative plaque or mural tablet affixed to a wall, to a large and elaborate structure, on the ground or as a mural monument, which may include an effigy of the deceased person and other figures of familial, heraldic or symbolic nature. It is usually placed immediately above or close to the actual burial vault or grave, although very occasionally the tomb is constructed within it. Sometimes the monument is a cenotaph, commemorating a person buried at another location. 

Once only the subject of antiquarian curiosity, church monuments are today recognised as works of funerary art. They are also valued by historians as giving a highly detailed record of antique costume and armour, by genealogists as a permanent and contemporary record of familial relationships and dates, and by students of heraldry as providing reliable depictions for heraldic blazons. From the middle of the 15th century, many figurative monuments started to represent genuine portraiture where before had existed only generalised representations.

Development

Medieval period
The earliest English church monuments were simple stone coffin-shaped grave coverings incised with a cross or similar design; the hogback form is one of the earliest types. The first attempts at commemorative portraiture emerged in the 13th century, executed in low relief, horizontal but as in life. Gradually these became full high-relief effigies, usually recumbent, as in death, and, by the 14th century, with hands together in prayer. In general, such monumental effigies were carved in stone, marble or wood, or cast in bronze or brass. Often the stone effigies were painted to resemble life, but on the vast majority of medieval monuments, the paint has long since disappeared. The cross-legged attitude of many armoured figures of the late 13th or early 14th centuries was long supposed to imply that the deceased had served in the Crusades, had taken crusading vows, or more specifically had been a Knight Templar; but these theories are now rejected by scholars. Feet were often supported by stylised animals, usually either a lion indicating valour and nobility (generally for men), or a dog indicative of loyalty (generally for women). Sometimes the footrest was an heraldic beast from the deceased's family coat of arms.

By the early 13th century, the effigies were raised on tomb-style chests (known as tomb chests, altar tombs or table tombs) decorated with foliage, heraldry or architectural detailing. Soon such chests stood alone with varying degrees of decorations. By the end of the century, these often had architectural canopies.  Small figures of weepers (often friends or relatives identified by their coats of arms) were popular decorative features. In the 15th century, the figures were often portrayed as angels or saints, and the chest might include a cadaver. The most refined monuments were made of alabaster. Around the 13th century, smaller two-dimensional effigies incised in plates of brass and affixed to monumental slabs of stone became popular too. These memorial brasses were somewhat cheaper and particularly popular with the emerging middle class.

Early modern period
The removal of almost all the many wall-paintings in English churches in the iconoclasm of the English Reformation and the English Commonwealth left plenty of bare spaces. Over the following centuries, these were gradually filled by monuments of the wealthy. It is the lack of competition from religious paintings and a tolerance of figurative sculpture in memorials, which most Protestant countries did not share, that produced the exceptionally rich English holdings of large sculptural church monuments. 
 
In the 16th century, church monuments became increasingly influenced by Renaissance forms and detailing (pilasters, wreaths, strapwork, skulls, coffered arches, obelisks, allegorical figures, etc.), particularly in France, the Netherlands and, eventually, England. There were major innovations in effigial posture, the deceased often being shown reclining or kneeling in prayer and surrounded by the whole family, as in life. Cadavers were replaced by skeletons. The 'hanging' mural or wall monument also became popular, sometimes with half-length 'demi-figures'; and also the floor-bound heraldic ledger stone. The 17th century saw an increase in classicism and the use of marble. Effigies might be sitting or standing, grief-stricken, shrouded or, unusually, rising from the grave. Busts and relief portraits were popular. High Baroque monuments were some of the grandest ever constructed. Decoration turned to cherubs, urns, drapery, garlands of fruit and flowers. In the 18th century, church monuments became more restrained, placed before two-dimensional pyramids, but more Roman-like, with the deceased often depicted in Roman dress or as a cameo-like 'medallion portrait'. The Rococo style gave more movement to these figures.

Victorian period
The early 19th century brought Greek Revival monuments, some quite plain wall plaques, some with sentimental and romantically realistic figures (perhaps rising to heaven), or other devices such as weeping willows. Gothic Revival followed, with the obvious return to alabaster, tomb chests and recumbent effigies. However, the Victorian age saw many differing styles, until large-scale monuments fell out of fashion at the end of the century. 20th-century large-scale monuments are not unknown, but quite rare.

Examples of English church monuments
The church monuments of England, in particular, have been preserved in far greater numbers and, generally, in better condition than those of other countries. They are second to none in artistic merit. Fine examples may be found in cathedrals and parish churches in every county.

"An Arundel Tomb"

"An Arundel Tomb", one of the best-known works by 20th-century English poet Philip Larkin, was inspired by a 14th-century English effigial monument. It was Larkin's response to a tomb monument in Chichester Cathedral, and the fact that the husband and wife subjects were portrayed holding hands. The photo at right also shows the stylized lion and dog figures at the feet of the lord and lady, respectively.

See also
Funerary hatchment
Ledger stone

Notes

Bibliography

.

External links

The Church Monuments Society
Royal Berkshire History: Church Monuments
Churchmouse: Church Monuments & Other Memorials of Interest (mostly Lincolnshire)
Medieval Combat Society: Thirteenth and Fourteenth Century Armorial Monumental Effigy and Brass Timeline
Handbook for identification and repair

Burial monuments and structures
Architecture in England
Monuments and memorials in England